Ryan France (born 13 December 1980 in Sheffield, England) is an English former professional footballer who last played for Sheffield United having spent the majority of his career at Alfreton Town and Hull City. His preferred position was as a right winger, but also played as a right wingback.

Career

Alfreton Town
Born in Sheffield, France started his career at Alfreton Town. He had been courted by a number of league clubs but chose to remain with Alfreton until he had completed his degree at Nottingham Trent University where he graduated in Sport & Exercise Science and Mathematics. After an impressive start to the season, scoring five goals in seven games, he was signed for Hull City by then manager Peter Taylor in September 2003 for a fee of £15,000. Previously he had spent time on trial at Ipswich Town without being offered a contract.

Hull City
The day after signing for Hull, he scored on his début (as a substitute) in a 6–1 victory over Kidderminster Harriers. France achieved the impressive feat of four consecutive promotions: 2001–02 and 2002–03 in non-league football with Alfreton and 2003–04 and 2004–05 with Hull City in the Football League.

In the 2006–07 season, France's versatility was demonstrated as he played in a variety of positions for City, including left-wing, right-back and central midfield. However, in February 2007, in a game against West Brom, France ruptured a cruciate ligament in his left knee, ruling him out for the remainder of the season.

When France appeared for Hull City against Arsenal in the Premier League during the 2008–09 season, he joined an elite band of players to have represented the same football club in all four divisions. His second and final Premier League appearance came against Chelsea at Stamford Bridge. By June 2009 however France, along with eight other players, was told he was being released by the club after six seasons.

Sheffield United
Having been on trial at Sheffield Wednesday and even scoring in The Owls' pre-season victory over Hartlepool United, he joined cross town rivals Sheffield United on 24 July 2009, signing a two-year deal. 
He made his debut for The Blades in the first game of the new season; a 0–0 draw with Middlesbrough. France was unable to hold down a place in the first team, regularly featuring as an unused sub for the first half of the season. After making only nine league appearances for the Blades he picked up a knee injury in February 2010. The injury was only expected to keep him sidelined for six to eight weeks but he was never to play for the club again, failing to recover his fitness for the remainder of his contract. He revealed in a Hull City programme against West Ham United on 5 November 2011 that he had retired from the game due to a knee injury.

References

External links
Ryan France player profile at hullcityafc.net

1980 births
Living people
Footballers from Sheffield
English footballers
Alfreton Town F.C. players
Hull City A.F.C. players
Sheffield United F.C. players
Alumni of Nottingham Trent University
Premier League players
English Football League players
Association football midfielders
Association football utility players